Vanessa Zamora Ramírez (born July 22, 1991) is a Mexican singer, songwriter and composer, known professionally as Vanessa Zamora. She speaks English and Spanish fluently. Zamora plays several instruments including acoustic guitar, piano, keyboard and drums.

Biography 
Vanessa Zamora is a singer and songwriter of Mexican descent born in Tijuana, Baja California on July 22, 1991. Zamora is a daughter of parents who were pianists; since a very early age she showed interest in the classic arts; learning guitar, drums, acting, ballet and modeling. She started attending piano classes at 8 years old at Academia de Música de Mexico acquiring instruction in piano, at 9 years old she was instructed in guitar and drums. She continued with her music as a hobby until she was 18 years old, attending university at Universidad Autónoma de Guadalajara, at that time she publicly started showing her music; she began doing video covers of various artists uploading them on YouTube and other social networking sites; she was known for the habit of writing whatever she thought, lived or felt in notebooks which she described as "brain drain. In 2012 she concluded her first EP 'Correr', later in 2012 'No Sabes'. She graduated in communication sciences in 2013 as an honor student. In 2014 she presented her first album Hasta la fantasía. In 2015 she presented the single 'Control'.

Discography

Albums 
Tornaluna (2018)
Hasta la fantasía (2014)

Singles 
 "Correr" (2012)
 "No sabes" (2012)
 "Te quiero olvidar" (2014)
 "Control" (2015)

References

External links 
 
 

Mexican women singer-songwriters
Mexican singer-songwriters
Singers from Mexico City
People from Tijuana
Singers from Baja California
1991 births
Living people
Mexican women pop singers
21st-century Mexican singers
21st-century Mexican women singers